is a Japanese architect who teaches at Keio University SFC. In 1993, he received the Pritzker Prize for his work, which often explores pioneering uses of new materials and fuses the cultures of east and west.

Early life
Maki was born in Tokyo. After studying at the University of Tokyo and graduating with a Bachelor of Architecture degree in 1952, he moved to the Cranbrook Academy of Art in Bloomfield Hills, Michigan, graduating with a master's degree in 1953. He then studied at Harvard Graduate School of Design, graduating with a Master of Architecture degree in 1954.

Career
In 1956, he took a post as assistant professor of architecture at Washington University in St. Louis, where he also was awarded his first commission: the design of Steinberg Hall (an art center) on the university's Danforth Campus. This building remained his only completed work in the United States until 1993, when he completed the Yerba Buena Center for the Arts building in San Francisco. In 2006, he returned to Washington University in St. Louis to design the new home for the Mildred Lane Kemper Art Museum and Walker Hall.

In 1960 he returned to Japan to help establish the Metabolism Group. He worked for Skidmore, Owings and Merrill in New York City and for Sert Jackson and Associates in Cambridge, Massachusetts and founded Maki and Associates in 1965.

In 2006, he was invited to join the judging panel for an international design competition for the new Gardens by the Bay in Singapore. Maki designed an extension building for the MIT Media Lab in Cambridge, Massachusetts, which was completed in 2009.

After completing a $330 million expansion of the headquarters of the United Nations in Manhattan, Maki designed Tower 4 at the former World Trade Center site which opened in 2013. While it has criticized his 51 Astor Place project as "out of place," New York magazine called Tower 4 "pretty exquisite."

Maki will be designing the London campus of the Aga Khan University along with a cultural centre as part of the King's Cross development project. These will be Maki's first European projects and represent the third and fourth Aga Khan projects for Maki, who also designed the Delegation of the Ismaili Imamat in Ottawa and Aga Khan Museum in Toronto. He was also assigned by the Sonja & Reinhard Ernst Stiftung to design the Museum Reinhard Ernst in Wiesbaden, Germany, to display the foundations’ collection of abstract art.

Works

Maki is known for fusing modernism with Japanese architectural traditions. For instance, he introduced the concept of oku, which is a spatial layout unique to Japan in which spaces wind around a structure. This is demonstrated in the use of walls and landscape in the Shimane Museum of Ancient Izumo.

Maki's other notable projects include the following:
 Steinberg Hall at Washington University (1960s in St. Louis)
 Hillside Terrace (1969– in Tokyo)
 work at Expo '70, with Kenzo Tange and others (1970, Osaka)
St. Mary's International School (1971 In Tokyo.)
 Osaka Prefectural Sports Center (1972, Takaishi, Osaka)
Spiral (1985, Tokyo)
Makuhari Messe (1989, Chiba)
Keio University Shonan Fujisawa Campus (1990, Kanagawa)
Tokyo Metropolitan Gymnasium (1991 in Sendagaya, Tokyo)
Yerba Buena Center for the Arts (1993 in San Francisco)
 Ensemble Global Gate (2000–2006 in Düsseldorf)
 Office Building Solitaire (2001 in Düsseldorf)
TV Asahi (2003 In Tokyo.)
Republic Polytechnic (2006 in Singapore)
Mildred Lane Kemper Art Museum and Walker Hall at Washington University (2006 in St. Louis)
Delegation of the Ismaili Imamat (2008 in Ottawa)
Building Square 3 at Novartis Campus (2009 in Basel, Switzerland)
Annenberg Public Policy Center at the University of Pennsylvania (2009 in Philadelphia)
MIT Media Lab Extension at Massachusetts Institute of Technology (2009 in Cambridge, Massachusetts)
51 Astor Place (2013 in Manhattan, New York)
Tower 4 (150 Greenwich Street) of the new World Trade Center (2013 in Manhattan)
Aga Khan Museum (2014 in Toronto)
Skyline @ Orchard Boulevard (2015 in Singapore)
Sea World Culture and Arts Center (2017 in Shekou)
Aga Khan Centre (2018 in London)

Works in progress

United Nations new building in New York City
Andhra Pradesh capital city, Amaravati
New city hall of Yokohama
Reinhard Ernst Museum in Wiesbaden

Gallery of works

Awards
 1988: Wolf Prize in Arts
 1993: Pritzker Architecture Prize
 1993: International Union of Architects Gold Medal
 1999: Praemium Imperiale
 2011: AIA Gold Medal

References

Further reading
 Maki, Fumihiko, "Investigations in Collective Form", A Special Publication Number 2, The School of Architecture, Washington University in St. Louis: June 1964
 10 Stories of Collective Housing, by a+t research group. Chapter 8. Hillside Terrace. Fumihiko Maki. Tokio, 1967-1998

External links

 Maki and Associates, official site
 Pritzker Prize – Fumiho Maki 
 Interview with Fumihiko Maki (video)
 Images of Tower 4, WTC (photos)

 
1928 births
Living people
People from Tokyo
20th-century Japanese architects
Modernist architects
Cranbrook Academy of Art alumni
Members of the Académie d'architecture
Harvard Graduate School of Design alumni
University of Tokyo alumni
Washington University in St. Louis faculty
Academic staff of Keio University
Pritzker Architecture Prize winners
Wolf Prize in Arts laureates
Recipients of the Praemium Imperiale
Fellows of the American Academy of Arts and Sciences
Members of the American Academy of Arts and Letters
Recipients of the AIA Gold Medal